The Eisenhower Commemorative silver dollar is a United States commemorative coin minted in 1990 to celebrate the 100th Anniversary of the birth of General/President Dwight D. Eisenhower. This coin is not to be confused with the Eisenhower dollar or the Eisenhower Presidential dollar which were regular issue American coins.

Specifications 

 Box Color: Green
 Edge: Reeded
 Weight: 26.73 grams
 Diameter: 38.1 millimeters
 Composition: 90% Silver, 10% Copper
 Silver Content: 0.77344 ounces

About this commemorative 
The Eisenhower Commemorative Dollar or Eisenhower Centennial Dollar was minted in 1990. It is a modern commemorative and the first American silver coin to be minted at the West Point Mint. The obverse was designed by John Mercanti which shows Eisenhower as a president superimposed on Eisenhower the general. The dual portrait symbolizes both his military service and peacetime leadership. This is the only U.S. coin to feature two portraits of the same person on the same side of one coin. The reverse side of the coin was designed by Marcel Jovine and depicts the Eisenhower Home in Gettysburg, Pennsylvania.

The Eisenhower Commemorative Dollar was offered in both proof and uncirculated models with authorized mintage capped at 4 million coins. Although 4 million coins were authorized, sales were slower than originally projected and approximately 1.39 million coins were sold.

Mints 
 Uncirculated: (W – West Point Mint at the United States Military Academy in West Point, New York)
 Proof: (P – Philadelphia Mint in Philadelphia, Pennsylvania)

Mintage figures 
 1990-W (Uncirculated): 241,669
 1990-P (Proof): 1,144,461

See also

 
 
 United States commemorative coins
List of United States commemorative coins and medals (1990s)

References
 Yeoman, R.S. A Guide Book of United States Coins Atlanta: Whitman Publishing, 2004
 Edler, Joel and Harper, Dave U.S. Coin Digest Iola: Krause Publications, 2004

External links 

 PCGS Price Guide for Modern Commemoratives

Modern United States commemorative coins
United States silver coins
Cultural depictions of Dwight D. Eisenhower
Currencies introduced in 1990